Rock Island is an island in Narragansett Bay in the U.S. state of Rhode Island.

Rock Island is a small rocky island near Pawtuxet Village and is now connected to the mainland by a causeway. The island is part of the Salter Grove public picnic ground and is the site for a proposed man-made salt marsh using dredged materials. The island contains several unusual fossils.

References 
 Narragansett Bay: A Friend's Perspective
Frederic Denlson, Narragansett Sea and Shore, (J.A. & R.A. Reid, Providence, RI., 1879)
George L. Seavey, Rhode Island's Coastal Natural Areas.

Islands of Rhode Island
Landforms of Kent County, Rhode Island
Islands of Narragansett Bay